Jackie Leonard Bates (born October 12, 1986 in Sacramento, California) is a former American football cornerback. He was signed by the Kansas City Chiefs as an undrafted free agent in 2009. He played college football at Hampton.

External links
Kansas City Chiefs bio
Oregon Ducks bio
Hampton Pirates bio
2008 Jackie Bates Q&A

1986 births
Living people
Players of American football from Sacramento, California
American football cornerbacks
Oregon Ducks football players
Hampton Pirates football players
Kansas City Chiefs players
San Jose SaberCats players